Donacia brevitarsis is a species of leaf beetle of the subfamily Donaciinae. Distributed from France to Russia, in northern Italy and Central Europe.

References

Beetles described in 1884
Beetles of Europe
Donaciinae